Suriname requires its residents to register their motor vehicles and display vehicle registration plates. Current plates are North American standard 6 × 12 inches (152 × 300 mm). Current plates are black on yellow. Configuration is two letters and four numbers where first letter is always letter P.

References

Suriname
Transport in Suriname
Suriname transport-related lists